Flavio Bucci (25 May 1947 – 18 February 2020) was an Italian actor, voice actor and film producer.

Biography
Born in Turin, Bucci began appearing in film and television in 1971, making his debut appearance in the film The Working Class Goes to Heaven. He is known for playing Daniel, the blind pianist, in Dario Argento's Suspiria and for playing the thuggish Blackie in Aldo Lado's 1975 Night Train Murders. Another one of Bucci’s iconic appearances was in the 1978 film Closed Circuit directed by Giuliano Montaldo, with whom he made several film collaborations with.

On stage, Bucci appeared in adaptations of Who's Afraid of Virginia Woolf?; The Clown and more. He also recited poems written by Giacomo Leopardi.

Bucci had a rare career as a voice dubber during the 1970s and 1980s. He dubbed John Travolta in his earlier films as well as Sylvester Stallone in The Lords of Flatbush. His character dubbing roles for television include Potsie Weber in the first two seasons of Happy Days and Luke Duke in the first five seasons of The Dukes of Hazzard.

Personal life
Bucci had two children from his marriage to actress Micaela Pignatelli, Alessandro and Lorenzo. He also had a son, Ruben from his second marriage to Dutch film producer Loes Kamsteeg.

On 18 February 2020, Bucci died of a heart attack in Fiumicino, at the age of 72.

Filmography

Cinema

 The Working Class Goes to Heaven (1971) - Operaio
 Lover of the Great Bear (1971)
 Il generale dorme in piedi (1972) - Bucci (uncredited)
 Property Is No Longer a Theft (1973) - Total
 Last Stop on the Night Train (1975) - Blackie
 I giorni della chimera (1975)
 And Agnes Chose to Die (1976) - Il pugliese
 Strange Occasion (1976) - Réné Bernard - the director (segment "Italian superman")
 La Orca (1976) - Gino
 Suspiria (1977) - Daniel
 A Spiral of Mist (1977) - Vittorio Conte - The Doctor
 Dove volano i corvi d'argento (1977) - Simula
 Closed Circuit (1978, TV Movie) - Sociologist
 Gegè Bellavita (1978) - Gennarino Amato
 Ammazzare il tempo (1979) - Igor
 To Love the Damned (1980) - Riccardo 'Svitol'
 Men or Not Men (1980) - Enne 2
 The Homeless One (1981) - Il matlosa
 Il Marchese del Grillo (1981) - Fra' Bastiano
 The Magic Mountain (1982) - Ludovico Settembrini
 Dream of a Summer Night (1983) - Oberon
 The Incinerator (1984) - Hunchback
 The Two Lives of Mattia Pascal (1985) - Terenzio Papiano
 Tex and the Lord of the Deep (1985) - Kanas
 La donna delle meraviglie (1985) - Astolfo
 Il giorno prima (1987) - Herman Pundt
 Freckled Max and the Spooks (1987) - Mr. Talbot - the Werewolf
 Secondo Ponzio Pilato (1987) - Erode
 Com'è dura l'avventura (1987) - Padre Ribaldo
 Control (1987, TV Movie) - Pietro Brisani
 La posta in gioco (1988) - Gulli
 Anni 90 (1992) - Professor Moira ("Terapia di gruppo")
 Pierino Stecchino (1992)
 Amami (1993) - Piero Pagani
 Teste rasate (1993) - Riccardo
 Quando le montagne finiscono (1994) - Bepi Zomegnan
 Fratelli coltelli (1997) - Vannino
 My Dearest Friends (1998) - Botanico
 Frigidaire - Il film (1998) - Nat Krylov
 Lucignolo (1999) - Padre di Lucio
 Muzungu (1999) - Bishop
 Volesse il cielo! (2002) - Uomo Angelo
 Hotel Dajti (2002) - Andrea anziano
 Lettere al vento (2003)
 Caterina in the Big City (2003) - Lorenzo Rossi Chaillet
 Il silenzio dell'allodola (2005) - Direttore del carcere
 Flying Lessons (2007) - Leone, padre di Pollo
 La morte di pietra (2008) - Pierre
 Il Divo (2008) - Franco Evangelisti
 Fly Light (2009) - Barbone
 Border Line (2010)
 La scomparsa di Patò (2010) - Capitano Arturo Bosisio
 La grande rabbia (2016) - Virgilio,Padre Matteo
 Tutto può accadere nel villaggio dei miracoli (2016) - Armando Lucchi
 Il vangelo secondo Mattei (2016) - Franco Gravela
 Borghi e Demoni (2017) - Padre Superiore
 Agadah (2017) - Vecchio Moreno
 Il grande passo (2017) - Umberto Cavalieri
 Credo in un solo padre (2019) - Zio Domenico Bianco
 La Cornice (2019) - Il pittore

Dubbing roles

Live action
Danny Zuko in Grease
Tony Manero in Saturday Night Fever
Stanley Rosiello in The Lords of Flatbush
Stuart Richards in Cruising
Potsie Weber in Happy Days (seasons 1-2)
Luke Duke in The Dukes of Hazzard (seasons 1-5)

References

External links

1947 births
2020 deaths
Film people from Turin
Italian male film actors
Italian male television actors
Italian male stage actors
Italian male voice actors
Italian film producers
Actors from Turin
Nastro d'Argento winners
20th-century Italian male actors
21st-century Italian male actors